"Got the morbs" is a slang phrase or euphemism used in the Victorian era. The phrase describes a person afflicted with temporary melancholy or sadness. The term was defined in James Redding Ware's 1909 book Passing English of the Victorian Era.

Etymology and history
Morbs is a slang abstract noun that is derived from the adjective morbid. The word morbid came from the original Latin word , which meant 'sickly', 'diseased' or 'unwholesome'. The word also has roots in the Latin word , which meant 'sorrow', 'grief', or 'distress of the mind'. The phrase appeared in the book Passing English of the Victorian Era (1909) by James Redding Ware. The book states that the phrase dates from 1880 and defines it: "Temporary melancholia. Abstract noun coined from adjective morbid." The British lexicographer Susie Dent described "having the morbs" as "to sit under a cloud of despondency".

Popular culture
In 2015, the Boston-based indie rock band the Sheila Divine released a full-length album titled The Morbs. An all-girl band in Lincoln, Nebraska, named themselves the Morbs after the phrase.

See also 
 Depression in childhood and adolescence
 Depression (mood)
 Existential crisis
 Feeling
 Melancholia
 Mixed anxiety–depressive disorder

References

External links

Euphemisms
Colloquial terms
British slang
Victorian era